Five of Coins is a card used in Latin suited playing cards which include tarot decks. It is part of what tarot card readers call the "Minor Arcana"
Tarot cards are used throughout much of Europe to play tarot card games.

In English-speaking countries, where the games are largely unknown, Tarot cards came to be utilized primarily for divinatory purposes.

Divination usage
This card suggests a grim and hard situation, a quagmire which the subjects won't soon be out of. You may be ambivalent, trapped in indecision, and feeling left out or shut off, but determined.

The church windows imply charities and hopes, difficult to satisfy, but still worth fighting for. The right figure pictured isn't obviously friend or foe to the man on crutches, suggesting an uncertain relation. Obviously someone is in need of help, and you will be either drawn or repelled by someone or something in slow degrees. The bell around the  crippled man's neck means the issue is insistent, and though you may want to ignore it, you should not, cannot, because ignoring only worsens a problem of severity. In medieval times, lepers were made to wear a bell around their neck to warn others of their approach so people could avoid them.

This card foretells of material trouble above all, whether in the form illustrated, that is, destitution, or otherwise; it is also a card of love and for lovers – wife, husband, friend, mistress — showing a state of concordance and affinity between the two figures.

Common interpretation

The Five of Coins, or the Five of Pentacles is a card when upright means to lose all faith, losing resources, losing a lover (mostly shows up when you've had a breakup), and losing security whether financially or emotionally (or both).

The Reversed meaning of the card is when hope returns slowly but surely, you can be positive from the troubles you've recently experienced, mostly shows up when you are back into a relationship again that was once broken, a renewal of faith. The advice of the card is to see a glass as half full not half empty, to seek help when you need it and not fear rejection.

References

Suit of Coins